The 2016 US Chess Championship was played between April 13 and 30, 2016 in the Chess Club and Scholastic Center of Saint Louis in Saint Louis, Missouri. The main tournament consisted of the top-3 US players in terms of FIDE ranking, Wesley So, Hikaru Nakamura, and Fabiano Caruana. The other tournament participants included Gata Kamsky, Varuzhan Akobian, Alexander Shabalov, Alexander Onischuk, Aleksandr Lenderman, Samuel Shankland, Ray Robson, and juniors Akshat Chandra and Jeffery Xiong.

Results
Fabiano Caruana won the championship with 8.5 points out of a maximum 11 (+6-0=5).

Final results as of 25 April 2016.

{| class="wikitable" style="text-align:center;"
! Pl. !! Player !! Rating !! 1 !! 2 !! 3 !! 4 !! 5 !! 6 !! 7 !! 8 !! 9 !! 10 !! 11 !! 12 !! Points !! TPR
|-style="background:#ccffcc;"
| 1 || align=left | || 2795
| X ||  ½
||1||½
||1||½
||½
||1||1||1||½
||1|| 8.5 || +59
|-
| 2 || align="left" |  || 2773
| ½ ||  X
||½
||½
||½
||½
||1||½
||½
||1||1||1|| 7.5 || +1
|-
| 3 || align="left" |  || 2787
|  0
||½
||  X
||½
||½
||1||½
||1
||1||1||1
|| ½ || 7.5 || 	 	 		-16
|-
| 4 || align="left" |  || 2663
|  ½
||½
||½
||  X
||1||½
||½
||½
||½
||  ½
||1||1|| 7.0 || +86
|-
| 5 || align="left" |  || 2664
|  0
||½
||½
||0||X||½
||½
||1||1||½
||½
||1|| 6.0 || +20
|-
| 6 || align="left" |  || 2618
|  ½
||½
||0||½
||½
||X||1||½
||½
||½
||½
||½
|| 5.5 || +71
|-
| 7 || align="left" |  || 2678
|  ½
||0||½
||½
||½
||0
||X
||½
||½
||½
||½
||1|| 5.0 || -46
|-
| 8 || align="left" |  || 2656
|0||½
||0
||½
||0||½
||½
||X||½
||1||0||1|| 4.5 || -57
|-
| 9 || align="left" |  || 2618
|  0
||½
||0||½
||0||½
||½
||½
||X
||½
||½
||1|| 4.5 || -30
|-
| 10 || align=left |  || 2615
| 0 ||0
||0||½
||½
||½
||½
||0||½
|| X ||1||1|| 4.5 || -16
|-
| 11 || align="left" |  || 2528
|  ½
||0
||0||0||½
||½
||½
||1
||½
||0|| X ||  ½
|| 4.0 || +48
|-
| 12 || align=left |  || 2477
|  0
||0||½
||0
||0||½
||0||0||0
||0||½
|| X || 1.5 || -154
|-
|}

Ultimate Blitz Challenge 

In addition to the main tournament the 2016 U.S. Chess Championship also hosted an Ultimate Blitz Challenge, a special exhibition blitz tournament. Former world champion Garry Kasparov played against the top three finishers of the 2016 U.S. Chess Championship. The top three finishers turned out to be the top three seeds, Fabiano Caruana, Wesley So, and Hikaru Nakamura. All three were ranked among the top 10 in the world at the time, so this tournament represents the first time Kasparov played against top chess players since his retirement in 2005. The total prize fund for the tournament was US$50,000, with individual prize breakdowns of $20,000, $15,000, $10,000, and $5,000 depending on final score.

Results 

{| class="wikitable" style="text-align:center;"
! Pl. !! Player !! Rating !! 1 !! 2 !! 3 !! 4 !! Points
|-style="background:#ccffcc;"
| 1 || align=left | || 2883 || X || 0 1 ½ 1 1 ½ || ½ 0 1 ½ ½ 0 || 1 0 1 ½ 1 1 || 11
|-
| 2 || align=left | || 2726 || 1 0 ½ 0 0 ½ || X || 0 1 1 1 ½ ½	|| 0 ½ 1 1 ½ 1 || 10 
|-
| 3 || align=left | || 2812 || ½ 1 0 ½ ½ 1 || 1 0 0 0 ½ ½	|| X || ½ ½ 1 1 0 1 || 9½ 
|-
| 4 || align=left | || 2665 || 0 1 0 ½ 0 0 || 1 ½ 0 0 ½ 0 || ½ ½ 0 0 1 0 || X || 5½ 
|}

See also
U.S. Chess Championship

References

External links
Official US Chess Championship Site

Chess national championships
Chess in the United States
2016 in chess
2016 in American sports
2016 in Missouri
April 2016 sports events in the United States